In Greek mythology, Asterion (Ancient Greek: , gen.: , literally "starry") or Asterius was a King of Crete and the foster-father of Minos.

Mythology 
Asterion was the son of Tectamus (son of Dorus) and an unnamed daughter of Cretheus. His father sailed to Crete with some Aeolians and Pelasgians and became the ruler of the island. Asterion inherited the throne from his father and he was the king of Crete at the time when Europa was abducted by Zeus and brought to his kingdom. He married Europa and became the stepfather of her sons by Zeus, who assumed the form of a bull (not to be confused with the Cretan Bull that was sire to the minotaur) to accomplish his role. Asterion brought up his stepsons: Minos, the just king in Crete who judged the Underworld; Rhadamanthus, presiding over the Blessed Island or in the Underworld; and Sarpedon, king in Lycia. When he died without male heirs, Asterion gave his kingdom to Minos, who promptly "banished" his brothers after quarreling with them. Crete, daughter of Asterion, was a possible wife of Minos.

Citations

Sources

Primary sources 
 Apollodorus, The Library with an English Translation by Sir James George Frazer, F.B.A., F.R.S. in 2 Volumes, Cambridge, MA, Harvard University Press; London, William Heinemann Ltd. 1921. ISBN 0-674-99135-4. Online version at the Perseus Digital Library. Greek text available from the same website.
 Diodorus Siculus, The Library of History translated by Charles Henry Oldfather. Twelve volumes. Loeb Classical Library. Cambridge, Massachusetts: Harvard University Press; London: William Heinemann, Ltd. 1989. Vol. 3. Books 4.59–8. Online version at Bill Thayer's Web Site
 Diodorus Siculus, Bibliotheca Historica. Vol 1-2. Immanel Bekker. Ludwig Dindorf. Friedrich Vogel. in aedibus B. G. Teubneri. Leipzig. 1888-1890. Greek text available at the Perseus Digital Library.
 Nonnus of Panopolis, Dionysiaca translated by William Henry Denham Rouse (1863-1950), from the Loeb Classical Library, Cambridge, MA, Harvard University Press, 1940.  Online version at the Topos Text Project.
 Nonnus of Panopolis, Dionysiaca. Three vols. W.H.D. Rouse. Cambridge, MA., Harvard University Press; London, William Heinemann, Ltd. 1940-1942. Greek text available at the Perseus Digital Library.
 Pausanias, Description of Greece with an English Translation by W.H.S. Jones, Litt.D., and H.A. Ormerod, M.A., in 4 Volumes. Cambridge, MA, Harvard University Press; London, William Heinemann Ltd. 1918. . Online version at the Perseus Digital Library
 Pausanias, Graeciae Descriptio. Three vols. Leipzig, Teubner. 1903.  Greek text available at the Perseus Digital Library.

Secondary sources 
 A. B. Cook, Zeus, i.543ff.
 Karl Kerenyi. The Gods of the Greeks. London: Thames & Hudson, 1951.
 Karl Kerenyi. Dionysus: Archetypal Image of Indestructible Life, 1976.
 Sara Douglass, 2002–6. The Troy Game Series. (Asterion referred to as the name of the Minotaur)

Kings of Crete
Kings in Greek mythology
Cretan characters in Greek mythology
Cretan mythology